Alberta Brianti (born 5 April 1980) is a former professional tennis player from Italy.

On 13 June 2011, Brianti achieved her career-high singles ranking of 55. On 13 February 2012, she peaked at No. 68 in the doubles rankings.

She won one singles title on the WTA Tour in her career, at Fes, Morocco in 2011.

Biography
She is coached by Laura Golarsa and Niccola Vercellino. Her parents are Attilio and Rita, and her brothers are Andrea (engineer) and Alessandro (student). Her favourite surface is hard and she began playing tennis at age 6 when her family introduced her to the sport at a local club. She speaks Italian, English and French. Her favourite tournaments are Wimbledon and Stuttgart.

WTA career finals

Singles: 2 (1–1)

Doubles: 4 (2–2)

ITF Circuit finals

Singles: 27 (9–18)

Doubles: 17 (11–6)

Grand Slam performance timelines

Singles

Doubles

External links
 Albert Brianti personal blog
 
 
 

1980 births
Living people
Italian female tennis players
Sportspeople from the Province of Parma